James Peck may refer to:

James H. Peck (1790–1836), American judge in Missouri impeached for abuse of power
James Peck (artist) (born 1968), artist and writer born in the Falkland Islands
James Peck (athlete) (1880–1955), Canadian athlete at the 1904 Summer Olympics
Sir James Peck (civil servant) (1875–1964), British civil servant and local government officer
James Peck (pacifist) (1914–1993), pacifist, radical journalist, and civil rights advocate
James Peck (pilot) (1912–1996), African-American aviator who served as a pilot in the Spanish Republican Air Force
James Stevens Peck (1838–1884), Vermont attorney and military leader

See also
Peck (surname)
James Peckham (14th century), an English politician